= Rasinampatti =

Village in Madurai district, Tamil Nadu, India

Rasinampatti is a small village in Madurai district of Tamil Nadu, India.
